During the existence of the Republic of Vietnam, there were four coup d'états in South Vietnam and at least another four attempted coups.

South Vietnamese coup may refer to:

Coups 

 1963 South Vietnamese coup
 January 1964 South Vietnamese coup
 December 1964 South Vietnamese coup
 1965 South Vietnamese coup

Coup attempts 

 1960 South Vietnamese coup attempt
 September 1964 South Vietnamese coup attempt
 Buddhist Uprising
 1962 South Vietnamese Independence Palace bombing

Other 

 Arrest and assassination of Ngo Dinh Diem
 Reaction to the 1963 South Vietnamese coup

Disambiguation pages